This is a list of big-box stores by country.

Multi-national
Auchan - hypermarkets; France
B&Q - DIY home improvement; United Kingdom
Babies "R" Us - baby clothes, care products, furniture, toys (Defunct)
Barnes & Noble - books, music, videos, magazines
Best Buy - music, videos, electronics, computer software, appliances
Blockbuster Video - video rental (Defunct)
Borders - books, music, videos (Defunct)
Bricorama - D.Y, gardening; France
Bunnings Warehouse - Home improvement; Australia and New Zealand (formerly United Kingdom and Ireland)
Cabela's - hunting, fishing, camping; historically a US-only chain, but opened its first Canadian location in 2008
Carrefour - hypermarkets; France
Castorama - DIY, gardening; France
Conforama - home furniture, electronics; France
Cora
Costco - merged with Price Club; groceries, general merchandise
Darty - electronics, appliances
Decathlon - sports equipment, sports clothing, bicycles; France
E.Leclerc - hypermarkets; France
Fnac - music, videos, games, books, computer software, electronics, appliances; France
Galeries Lafayette - department store; France
Geoffrey's Toy Box - toys, video games, videos (Revival of Toys R Us)
Harvey Norman - furniture, housewares, electronics; Australia, New Zealand, Singapore, Malaysia, Ireland, United Kingdom (Northern Ireland), Slovenia and Croatia
Hipercor - hypermarkets; Spain
The Home Depot - hardware
IKEA - furniture, housewares
Kaufland - groceries, general merchandise; Germany, Czech Republic, Slovakia, Poland, Romania, Bulgaria and Croatia
Kmall24 - Korean cosmetics, groceries, households&groceries, clothing
Kmart - owned by Transformco; groceries, general merchandise; United States (formerly Canada, Australia, Czechoslovakia, Mexico, New Zealand and Singapore)
Big Kmart - groceries, general merchandise (Defunct)
Super Kmart - groceries, general merchandise (Defunct; United States, Australia and Mexico)
Sears Essentials - groceries, general merchandise (Defunct)
Sears Grand - groceries, general merchandise (Defunct)
Kmart Australia - owned by Wesfarmers previously related to Kmart stores in the US; general merchandise; Australia and New Zealand 
Leroy Merlin - DIY, gardening; France
Norauto - automotive; France
OBI
Office 1
Office Depot - office supplies
PetSmart - pet supplies
PriceSmart
Real - owned by Metro AG
Sephora - perfumes; France
Staples Inc. - office supplies, office equipment
Target - general merchandise
Tesco - hypermarkets; United Kingdom
Tower Records - music, videos (Defunct)
Toys "R" Us - toys, video games, videos (Temporarily Defunct)
Walmart - groceries, general merchandise
Sam's Club - groceries, general merchandise
Walmart Supercenter - groceries, general merchandise
The Warehouse Group

Australia
Big W
Bing Lee
Bunnings Warehouse
Costco
Harvey Norman
JB Hi-Fi
Kmart
Mitre 10
Officeworks
Supercheap Auto
Target
The Good Guys
IKEA

Bangladesh
Agora Super Stores
Meena Bazar

Canada
Best Buy
The Brick
Canadian Tire
Chapters
Costco
Dollarama
Food Basics
Geoffrey's Toy Box (revival of Toys R Us)
Giant Tiger
The Home Depot 
Home Outfitters
HomeSense
The Hudson's Bay Company
IKEA
Indigo Books and Music
Jean Coutu Group - pharmacy, grocery, general merchandise; located in Eastern Ontario and Quebec/New Brunswick
Jysk
Lawtons Drugs
La-Z-Boy
Loblaws supermarkets, and several of its subsidiaries, including:
 Real Canadian Superstore
 Shoppers Drug Mart
London Drugs
Mastermind Toys
Metro
Penningtons
PetSmart
Rona
Sears (defunct)
Sobeys
Sport Chek
Staples
Target (defunct)
Toys "R" Us 
Babies "R" Us 
Walmart 
Winners

China
Carrefour - France
Costco - USA
Walmart - USA
Best Buy - USA

Hong Kong

CRC Superstores
PARKnSHOP Superstores and Megastores
Wellcome Superstores

France
3 Suisses - clothing, electronics, appliances, toys, general household merchandise
Auchan - hypermarket
Brico Depot - DIY
Bricomarché - Groupe Intermarché; DIY
Bricorama - Groupe Carrefour; DIY
Carrefour - hypermarket
Castorama - DIY, gardening
Celio - clothing
Conforama - home furniture, housewares, electronics
Darty - electronics, appliances
Decathlon - sports equipment, sports clothing, bicycles
E.Leclerc - hypermarket and cafeteria
Fnac - music, videos, games, books, computer software, electronics, appliances
Galeries Lafayette - department store
Géant - hypermarket
Groupe Casino - hypermarket and cafeteria
Habitat - home furniture, housewares
Hygena - kitchens
Hyper U - hypermarket
Intersport - sports equipment, sports clothing
Jean Delatour - jewellery
Leroy Merlin - DIY, gardening
Monoprix - hypermarket
Mr Bricolage - DIY
MS Mode - clothing
Norauto - automotive, car repair
Point P Groupe Saint-Gobain - DIY
Printemps - department store
La Redoute - clothing, electronics, appliances, toys, general household merchandise
Saint Maclou - home decoration
Sephora - perfumes
Soho - dollar store
Sport 2000 - sports equipment, sports clothing

India
Big Bazaar - owned by the Reliance Industries 
Easyday - owned by Reliance Industries
Giant Hypermarket
Ikea
More - owned by Amazon
Namdhari's Fresh
Jio Mart - owned by Reliance Industries Limited
Saravana Stores - owned by Saravana Stores
Spencer's Retail - owned by RPSG Group
D-mart
Apollo Pharmacy

Indonesia 
 ÆON
 Hero
 Hypermart
 Lotte Mart
 LuLu Hypermarket
 Transmart

Laos
BigC - part of Groupe Casino, France

Malaysia
Carrefour - France
Giant
Makro
Tesco

Norway
Coop Obs!
Smart Club (out of business)

New Zealand 

 Bunnings Warehouse - Home Improvement
 Kmart - General Merchandise
 Mitre 10 - Home Improvement
 Pak'nSave - Large format discount grocery
 The Warehouse - General Merchandise

Pakistan
Carrefour
Imtiaz Super Market
Makro Superstores
Metro Cash and Carry

Philippines
CSI
SM Hypermarket
Landers
S&R
Robinsons Supermarket
Puregold Supermarket

Singapore
Carrefour - France
Giant

Thailand
Big C - part of Groupe Casino, France and Central Retail Corporation
Siam Makro
Lotus's - part of Tesco UK and Lotus Supercenter
Tops Superstore - part of Central Food Retail

United Kingdom
Argos - general household merchandise, toys
Asda - grocery, general merchandise
B&Q - hardware, home improvement materials
Currys - electronics, white goods
DFS - furniture
Halfords - auto parts and accessories
Matalan - clothing
Morrisons - grocery, general merchandise
Sainsbury's - grocery, general merchandise
Tesco Extra - grocery, general household merchandise, clothing, furniture and electronics
Marks & Spencer - clothing, home, food, beauty and M&S bank
Waitrose - food

United States

Big Chain Stores
A.C. Moore - arts & crafts (defunct)
Ace Hardware - hardware, lumber
Albertsons - groceries, general merchandise
Aldi - groceries, general merchandise
Ames - clothing, general merchandise (defunct)
Ann & Hope - outlet store (defunct)
Art Van Furniture - furniture (defunct)
Ashley Furniture - furniture
At Home - home decor
AutoZone - auto parts
Barnes & Noble - books, music, videos
Bass Pro Shops - hunting, fishing, camping goods
Bed Bath & Beyond - home goods, housewares
Best Buy - home electronics, appliances
Big Lots - discount store, general merchandise, furniture
Books-A-Million - books, music, videos
 2nd & Charles - used books, music, videos, games
Borders - books, music, videos (defunct)
 Waldenbooks - used books, music, videos (defunct)
Bradlees - department store (defunct)
Burlington - clothing, general merchandise 
Buy Buy Baby - baby superstore
Cabela's - hunting, fishing, camping goods, clothing
Caldor - department store (defunct)
CarMax - used car superstore
Child World - toys (defunct)
Circuit City - home electronics (defunct)
CompUSA - home electronics (defunct)
The Container Store - storage supplies
Cost Plus World Market - housewares
Crate & Barrel - home goods, housewares, kitchen supplies
Crown Books - books (defunct)
Curacao - electronics, furniture, general merchandise
CVS Pharmacy - pharmaceuticals, general merchandise
DSW ("Designer Shoe Warehouse") - shoes
Dick's Sporting Goods - sporting goods, clothing
Dollar General - discount store
Dollar Tree - discount store
DressBarn - clothing (defunct)
Eckerd - pharmaceuticals, general merchandise (defunct)
Fallas - clothing
Family Dollar - discount store
Famous Footwear - shoes
Five Below - discount store
Floor & Decor - hardware
Fry's - home electronics, appliances, general merchandise (defunct)
FYE - music, videos
Gander Mountain - hunting, fishing, camping goods
Geoffrey's Toy Box - toys and games (revival of Toys R Us)
Goodwill - used clothing, home goods, used general merchandise
Golfsmith - golf-related products (defunct)
Gordmans - clothing (defunct)
Guitar Center - music equipment
Half Price Books - used books, music, videos, games, magazines
Hastings Entertainment - used books, music, videos, games, magazines (defunct)
hhgregg - home electronics (defunct)
Hobby Lobby - arts and crafts supplies
The Home Depot - hardware, lumber, plants, gardening supplies
HomeGoods - housewares
J. C. Penney - clothing, general merchandise
Jo-Ann Stores - arts and crafts
KB Toys - toys (defunct)
Kmart (Transformco) - groceries, clothing, general merchandise
Kohl's - clothing, home goods, kitchen supplies
Kroger - groceries, general merchandise (Marketplace)
Food 4 Less & Foods Co. - groceries
Fred Meyer - groceries, clothing, general merchandise
La-Z-Boy - furniture
Lechmere - electronics, furniture (defunct)
Levitz Furniture - furniture (defunct)
Linens n' Things - home furnishings (defunct)
Lowe's - hardware, lumber, plants, gardening supplies
Macy's - clothing, home goods, general merchandise
Marshalls - clothing
Mattress Firm - mattresses, bed-related products
Sleepy's - mattresses, bed-related products (defunct)
MC Sports - sporting goods (defunct)
Meijer - groceries, general merchandise
Menards - hardware, lumber, plants, gardening supplies
Mervyn's - department store (defunct)
Michaels - arts and crafts supplies
Modell's - sporting goods (defunct)
Office Depot / OfficeMax  - office supplies, furniture
Old Navy - clothing
Old Time Pottery - home décor
Ollie's Bargain Outlet - discount store, groceries, clothing, remaindered books, general merchandise
Party City - party supplies
Payless Shoe Source - shoes (defunct)
Petco - pet supplies
PetSmart - pet supplies
Pier 1 Imports - housewares, general merchandise (defunct late 2020)
Publix - groceries, general merchandise
RadioShack - electronics (defunct)
Raymour & Flanigan - furniture
Rite Aid - pharmaceuticals, groceries
Ross Dress for Less - clothing
Safeway - groceries, general merchandise
The Salvation Army - used clothing, home goods, used general merchandise
Sears (Transformco) - clothing, tools, appliances, general merchandise
Shopko - general merchandise (defunct)
ShopRite - groceries
Spirit Halloween - Halloween costumes
Sports Authority - sporting goods, clothing (defunct)
Staples - office supplies, furniture
Stein Mart - clothing, home furnishings (defunct)
Stop & Shop - groceries, pharmaceuticals
SuperCrown - books (defunct)
SuperValu
 New Albertsons
 Save-A-Lot
Target - general merchandise, clothing, groceries (Super Target)
Target Greatland - groceries, clothing, general merchandise
Thrift Drug - pharmaceuticals (defunct)
TJ Maxx - clothing
Marshalls - clothing
Toys "R" Us - toys and games (defunct)
Babies "R" Us - baby superstore (defunct)
Kids "R" Us - children's clothing (defunct)
Trader Joe's - groceries, general merchandise
Ulta Beauty - beauty supplies
Walgreens - pharmaceuticals, general merchandise
Walmart - groceries, clothing, general merchandise
 Walmart Supercenter
 Walmart Neighborhood Market
 Walmart Express (defunct)
Wet Seal - clothing (defunct)
Whole Foods Market - groceries, emphasizing 'natural', locally-sourced and organic products
Wickes Furniture - furniture (defunct)
The Wiz - home electronics (defunct)

Warehouse clubs
All locations of these chains offer groceries and general merchandise.
BJ's Wholesale Club
Costco
Sam's Club

Vietnam
BigC - part of Groupe Casino, France

See also
List of department stores
List of convenience stores
List of hypermarkets

Superstores